Jiangsu Hengrui Pharmaceuticals Company Ltd., also known as Jiangsu Hengrui, is a Chinese pharmaceutical company that manufactures and distributes various types of drug packaging materials, cancer-treating antineoplastics, cardiovascular medication, painkillers, antibiotics, and related products. It is the largest listed pharmaceutical company in China.

History 
Founded in 1970, Jiangsu Hengrui Pharmaceuticals was originally state-owned and called Lianyungang Pharmaceutical Factory. Headquartered in Lianyungang, Jiangsu, it was established in its current form in 1977. The company was listed on the Shanghai Stock Exchange in 2000 and now has locations in China, the United States, Germany, Switzerland, Japan, and Australia.

Research and development  
In 2020, Jiangsu Hengrui Pharmaceuticals set up research and development offices in Princeton, New Jersey, and in Basel, Switzerland. The Swiss-based Hengrui Europe Therapeutics AG also hosts the discovery research and development units. Their focus is on protein engineering and the mRNA technology platform.

Since December 2020, Jiangsu Hengrui Pharmaceuticals has run clinical trials on anti-cancer drugs such as:

 An anti-PD-1 immune checkpoint inhibitor camrelizumab for hepatocellular carcinoma;
 A nonsteroidal antiandrogen rezvilutamide for prostate cancer;
 A PARP inhibitor fluzoparib for solid cancers, especially prostate cancer;
 A VEGFR2 inhibitor apatinib as a combination therapy.

Trials were also performed in the fields of metabolic diseases (e.g., type 2 diabetes), autoimmune diseases (Interleukin-17 receptor blocker vanucizumab in psoriasis), HIV treatment, and analgesia.

See also
 Hansoh Pharmaceutical

References

External links
Jiangsu Hengrui Pharmaceuticals Company Limited

Companies listed on the Shanghai Stock Exchange
Pharmaceutical companies of China
Civilian-run enterprises of China
Companies based in Jiangsu
Pharmaceutical companies established in 1997
2000 initial public offerings